Mukesh Sharma (born 18 January 1965) is an Indian politician from Delhi. He four times served as member of Delhi Legislative Assembly. He thrice represented Hastsal and one time Uttam Nagar. He is currently serving as Chief Spokesperson and Chairman Media Communication of Delhi PCC.

Position held

References

Living people
20th-century Indian politicians
Indian National Congress politicians from Delhi
1965 births